Velimir is a Serbo-Croatian masculine given name and sometimes a surname, a Slavic name derived from elements vele "great" and mir "peace, prestige". It may refer to:

Velimir Ilić (born 1951), politician
Velimir Ivanović, (born 1978), Serbian footballer
Velimir Jovanović, (born 1987), Serbian footballer
Velimir Khlebnikov (1885–1922), Russian poet and playwright
Velimir Milošević (1937–2004), Montenegrin writer, poet, and editor
Velimir Naumović (1936–2011), Serbian footballer
Velimir Perasović (born 1965), Croatian basketball player
Velimir Radinović, (born 1981), Canadian-Serbian basketball player
Velimir Radman, (born 1983), Croatian footballer
Velimir Sombolac, (1939–2016), Serbian-Yugoslav footballer
Velimir Stjepanović, (born 1993), Serbian swimmer
Velimir Škorpik (1919–1943), Croatian-Yugoslav Partisan commander
Velimir Valenta (1929–2004), Croatian-Yugoslav rower
Velimir Vukićević (1871–1930), Serbian-Yugoslav politician
Velimir Zajec (born 1956), Croatian footballer and manager  
Velimir Živojinović (disambiguation), several people

Other
3112 Velimir

See also
 Wielimir, Polish equivalent
 Velimirović, surname

External links
 http://www.behindthename.com/name/velimir

Slavic masculine given names
Croatian masculine given names
Macedonian masculine given names
Montenegrin masculine given names
Slovene masculine given names
Serbian masculine given names